Sambomaster wa Kimi ni Katarikakeru (サンボマスターは君に語りかける 2005, English: Sambomaster Has Something To Say To You) is Sambomaster's second full-length album. It was the #76 sold album of the year selling  199,149 units.

Track listing

Sambomaster albums
2005 albums